At the 2013 Summer Universiade Hungary scored a total of 15 medals: 4 gold, 2 silver and 9 bronze.

Athletics

Men
Track & road events

Women
Field events

Combined events – Heptathlon

Badminton

Hungary did not compete in Badminton.

Basketball

Beach Volleyball

Belt Wrestling

Boxing

Canoeing

Chess

Women Individual

Diving

Fencing

Football

Gymnastic

Field hockey

Judo

Rowing

Rugby sevens

Sambo

Shooting

Swimming

Synchronized swimming

Table tennis

Tennis

Volleyball

Water polo

Weightlifting

Wrestling

References

Nations at the 2013 Summer Universiade
Hungary at the Summer Universiade
2013 in Hungarian sport